Oleria flora is a species of butterfly of the family Nymphalidae.

Subspecies

 Oleria flora flora; present in Guyana
 Oleria flora subspecies; present in Brazil

Description
Oleria flora has transparent wings with brown veins and a brown and orange border on the outer edge of the hindwings.

References

External links
 Neotropicab Butterflies

Ithomiini
Butterflies described in 1779